Saakshyam is a 2018 Indian Telugu-language action film directed by Sriwass and produced by Abhishek Pictures. It stars Bellamkonda Sreenivas, Pooja Hegde and Jagapathi Babu. Released on 27 July 2018, the film was a critical failure.

Plot
  
The movie starts with a group of people forcefully taking away a cow and its calf trying to follow them. The scene shifts to the house of Raju Garu, where the family has gathered for the naming ceremony of his son. Just then, a group of people come there with the calf and inform them that Munuswamy's  brothers have kidnapped the calf's mother (who belongs to the temple) along with many other cows. This leads to Raju Garu beating up Munuswamy's brother and bringing the cows back.

The news of his brothers' humiliation reaches Munuswamy, and he and his three brothers, go to Raju Garu's house, where the celebration is going on. They brutally kill every member of the family, except for Raju Garu's wife, who gets injured. Raju Garu manages to distract the brothers while his wife runs away with the child, but she becomes weak and is unable to continue due to her deep injury. Just then, the calf (whose mother was saved by Raju Garu) comes and stands in front of her. Raju Garu's wife takes this as a sign, wraps the child in a shawl, and ties him onto the calf. The villains come just in time to see the calf running away, and a chase ensures. The injured calf manages to evade the villains and land the baby on a truck carrying soil. The villains see the child falling down the cliff and believe him to be dead. In order to conceal their crime, they set fire to the cowshed, because in bad time even animals can become a prime witness to their sins.

The story then goes into a narration where the narrator explains that even though Munuswamy is happy that he has destroyed every witness to his crime, he has forgotten that the five elements of nature that are present everywhere have witnessed his crimes and will surely take their revenge for his atrocities.

Meanwhile, the child is carried to a soil mine, where the truck dumps him along with the soil. A Hindu saint sees the child, takes him to Kasi, and leaves him in Temple. A childless couple, Siva Prasad  and his wife, are there to pray for a child and are overwhelmed to see him. Then the temple priest names him Viswa because this is nature's order to rise the child by them. Later the couple leaves for the US with the child.

20 years later, Siva Prasad and his wife are shown to be celebrating the success of their company. A reporter asks about their son Viswa, who would be taking over the multi-billion dollar empire, but Siva Prasad states that Viswa is not interested in taking over the business as he is interested in developing games. Viswa and his friends are introduced. They are in the process of developing a new video game, which they are sending in to a company to be released.

Unfortunately, their video gets rejected due to lack of culture factor. Viswa and his friend  run into a girl named Soundarya Lahari, a Hindu Spiritual Preacher who came USA to preach on Indian mythology. Viswa is instantly smitten, so he and his friend follow her to get her help in developing the game with culture elements. However, Soundarya is offended by their offer of money and says flatly that culture is not something to be sold. Viswa and his friend help Soundarya's sister and brother-in-law to secure jobs, using his influence, which leads to Soundarya reluctantly agreeing to help Viswa.

She introduces the group to Valmiki her childhood friend an IT professional who has an ardent knowledge on Indian Mythology, who helps by giving them a unique idea for a game which resembles Viswa's life story - about a boy whose entire family was killed by villains and the five elements of nature taking revenge on the villains through the boy. Vishwa impressed with the concept of Valmiki and hired him to develop his game.

Meanwhile, Soundarya leaves for India to see her father Tagore, who was bedridden by Munuswamy's gang for fighting against them in court. Viswa follows her to India and starts developing the video game there.

Meanwhile, Munuswamy ordered to kill Soundarya because as a warning to stop Tagore on his way. Later in a couple situations Soundarya was saved by Vishwa from Veeraswamy, Munuswamy's 1st brother and eventually kill by him through the air and earth elements in nature. He was shell-shocked when he discovers the story of the video game happening in his real life. When he came to Kasi to give salutations from his mother side to kaasi Vishwanath temple there he accidentally meets 2nd brother of Munuswamy he was killed through him by element of fire. He tries his best to stop it, but in vain. Meanwhile, Munuswamy is on search of his brothers' killer.

Soundarya accepts Viswa's love for his efforts to save her from Munuswamy's brother and agrees to marry him. Meanwhile, Valmiki designs full game and come back to India and meets his grand father practicing the vedic astrology who are looking the bad omens of Munuswamy and his brothers and also fixing the marriage dates of Vishwa and Soundarya.

After hearing Valmiki's game concept he understands that this is a vengeance on Munuswamy and his brothers by the Almighty of Mother Nature because of their sins committed on Vishwa's biological parents. He remembers Valmiki that in his childhood in front of young Valmiki, Youth Munuswamy and his brothers criticizes the astrologer and denies god to leave on their own terms. He reveals to Valmiki that this screenplay was written by the mother nature through him, she witnessed all the incidents and selected him to design the situations and it cannot be stopped by anyone. 
Meanwhile, Viswa's business rival, Shakti join hands with Munuswamy for taking over his major stakes in India and abducts them, then he threatens Vishwa to give them the shares documents. Vishwa comes to deal with them finally, the nature elements of fire, water, earth, air take revenge on all the villains through Viswa which was witnessed by the other element Sky.

Cast

 Bellamkonda Sreenivas as Viswa, a video game developer and designer, Soundarya's love interest
 Pooja Hegde as Soundarya Lahari, a woman who teaches Hinduism and culture, Viswa's love interest
 Sarath Kumar as Raju Garu, Viswa's biological father, who was murdered by Munuswamy and his brothers
 Meena as Viswa's biological mother, who was murdered by Munuswamy and his brothers
 Jagapathi Babu as Munuswamy, the main antagonist, who killed Viswa's biological family
 Ravi Kishan as Veeraswamy, Munuswamy's 1st brother
 Ashutosh Rana as Munuswamy's 2nd brother
 Madhu Guruswamy as Munuswamy's 3rd brother
 Kabir Duhan Singh as Viswa's business rival
 Jayaprakash as Siva Prasad, Viswa's adopted father
 Pavithra Lokesh as Viswa's adopted mother
 Vennela Kishore as Viswa's friend
 Rao Ramesh as Tagore, Soundarya's father
 Posani Krishna Murali as Defense Lawyer
 Sameer as Raju Garu's brother
 Jhansi as Soundarya's sister
 Brahmaji as Soundarya's brother-in-law
 Krishna Bhagavaan as Soundarya's paternal uncle
 Hema as Soundarya's aunt
 Annapoorna as Soundarya's grandmother
 Raghu Babu as Siva Prasad's assistant
 Mahadevan as Munuswamy's aide
 Kasi Vishwanath as Advocate Murthy
 Surya as Hindu Saint
 Ananth Babu as Priest
 Ananta Sriram as Valmiki, a game designer (extended cameo appearance)
 Sri Pusapati as Sri, a Cognos developer (cameo appearance)

Soundtrack

The soundtrack of this film is composed by Harshavardhan Rameshwar. All the lyrics are written by Ananta Sriram. The music released on Junglee Music. A single track, "Soundarya Lahari" was released initially on 4 May 2018, through the internet. The complete audio was released on 7 July 2018 in Hyderabad.

Release
The film was released on 27 July 2018. The film was later dubbed and released in Hindi as Pralay: The Destroyer in 2020.

References

External links 
 

2018 films
2018 action films
Indian action films
2018 masala films
2010s Telugu-language films
Films directed by Sriwass
Films about video games
Films about mass murder
Films set in Andhra Pradesh
Films set in Konaseema